The spined soldier bug (Podisus maculiventris) is a species of stink bug common in North America. They are predators of gypsy moth caterpillars and the larvae of beetles such as the Colorado potato beetle and the Mexican bean beetle. Since the Mexican bean beetle is widely regarded as a notorious agricultural pest in North America, soldier bugs are generally considered to be beneficial garden insects.

P. maculiventris is a generalist predator with a broad host range, reportedly attacking 90 insect species, which includes several important economic pests. Reported prey include the larvae of the Mexican bean beetle, Colorado potato beetle, flea beetles and diamondback moth, and corn earworm, beet armyworm, fall armyworm, European corn borer, cabbage looper, imported cabbageworm, and velvetbean caterpillar. When prey is scarce, P. maculiventris may feed on plant juices, but this feeding is not reported to cause significant plant damage. 

P. maculiventris is associated with several crops, including alfalfa, apples, asparagus, beans, celery, cotton, crucifers, cucurbits, eggplant, potatoes, onions, soybeans, sweet corn and tomatoes. The effectiveness of this species in preying on economic pests has resulted in its use in classical biological control programs outside North America, including in Eastern Europe and in Russia. However, this has not been entirely successful in colder climates, perhaps due to the bug's inability to successfully overwinter. P. maculiventris eggs are sold commercially for use in control programs; this has proven successful in controlling pests in European and North American heated greenhouses. Use in large-area field crops is often not economically viable, due to the production costs of producing large numbers of P. maculiventris eggs. In addition, resident populations of P. maculiventris often are not sufficiently large to contain large larval pest emergences in the spring. Pheromones have been used to draw naturally occurring and newly emerging populations of this stink bug to target crops in the spring.

References

External links
 Cornell University. Biological Control
spined soldier bug on the UF / IFAS Featured Creatures Web site
Bugguide.net

Asopinae
Insects described in 1832
Hemiptera of North America